Oguni may refer to:

Oguni, Kumamoto, a town in Kumamoto Prefecture, Japan
Oguni, Niigata, a former town in Niigata Prefecture, Japan
Oguni, Yamagata, a town in Yamagata Prefecture, Japan
Oguni Station, a railway station in Oguni, Yamagata Prefecture

People with the surname
, Japanese writer
, Japanese boxer

Japanese-language surnames